Ha Jee-Min (born 21 March 1989 in Busan) is a South Korean sailor. He competed at the 2008, 2012 and 2016 Summer Olympics in the Men's Laser class, finishing in 28th, 24th and 13th place respectively.

References

External links
 
 
 

1989 births
Living people
South Korean male sailors (sport)
Olympic sailors of South Korea
Sailors at the 2008 Summer Olympics – Laser
Sailors at the 2012 Summer Olympics – Laser
Sailors at the 2016 Summer Olympics – Laser
Sailors at the 2020 Summer Olympics – Laser
Asian Games medalists in sailing
Asian Games gold medalists for South Korea
Sailors at the 2010 Asian Games
Sailors at the 2014 Asian Games
Sailors at the 2018 Asian Games
Medalists at the 2010 Asian Games
Medalists at the 2014 Asian Games
Medalists at the 2018 Asian Games
People from Busan